Sunday Love is the third studio album (second recorded) by Canadian singer Fefe Dobson. The album was released independently on June 13, 2006, then released digitally on the iTunes Store on December 18, 2012.

Originally slated for release in 2005, the release date was pushed back a number of times by Island Records before its eventual cancellation. The album had earned good reviews, including the highest rating given on any of the albums reviewed in the July 2006 issue of Vibe magazine. After the album was cancelled, Dobson commented on her Myspace blog, "I always believe everything happens for a reason, and that change is a very good thing." Before its official cancellation, a limited number of copies were shipped to stores, with it being fully leaked on the internet. The album remained unreleased for many years before its 2012 digital release.

Background
Dobson began work on Sunday Love during the summer of 2004. The album's fourteen tracks were recorded over an eight-month period in California. Island Records set an initial US release date of September 20, 2005. Neither single released from the album—"Don't Let It Go to Your Head" or "This Is My Life"—charted. There is an official music video for "Don't Let It Go to Your Head".  However, no video was made for "This Is My Life".

Another song from the album, "Be Strong", appears on the It's a Boy Girl Thing soundtrack.

Promotional items
There were "For Promotional Use Only" CDs, sometimes referred to as DJ singles, produced for the two singles.

Two samplers were also produced to promote the album:
 Fefe Dobson SUNDAY LOVE ALBUM SAMPLER
 Fefe Dobson SUNDAY LOVE IN STORE ALBUM SAMPLER

Track listing 

 "As a Blonde" (Fefe Dobson, Greg Wells, Shelly Peiken) – 2:49
 "In the Kissah" (Pharrell Williams, Chad Hugo, Dobson) – 3:09
 "If I Was a Guy" (Matthew Wilder, Dobson) – 3:20
 "Don't Let It Go to Your Head" (Josh Alexander, Billy Steinberg, Dobson) – 4:01
 "Get You Off" (Dobson, Michelle Robin Lewis, Nina Gordon) – 3:50
 "This Is My Life" (Alexander, Dobson, Steinberg) – 3:49
 "Scar" (Wilder, Dobson) – 4:03
 "Miss Vicious" (Dobson, John Lowery aka John 5) – 3:07
 "Man Meets Boy" (Wilder, Dobson) – 3:28
 "Get Over Me" (Holly Knight, Dobson) – 3:09
 "Hole" (Kay Hanley, Lewis, Dobson) – 4:27
 "The Initiator" (Alexander, Steinberg, Dobson) – 3:39
 "Yeah Yeah Yeah" (Walton Steven "Wally" Gagel, Peiken, Dobson) – 3:39
 "Be Strong" (Dobson, Wilder) – 3:31

Covers
Dobson's "Don't Let It Go to Your Head" is covered by Lilyjets, a Norwegian girl group, as a single from their 2006 debut album 3rd Floor. They also produced an official music video.

The music of "This Is My Life" is used by the Taiwanese girl-group S.H.E in their song: "I Love Trouble" (我愛烦恼) on their 2008 album FM S.H.E which became quite popular in Asia.

The song "As a Blonde" is covered on Selena Gomez & The Scene's 2009 debut album Kiss & Tell. Jordin Sparks covered "Don't Let Go To Your Head" on her 2009 album Battlefield. Shortly after Sparks's album was released Dobson said, "Jordin Sparks just did [that song], which was on Sunday Love, which was very cool. She did kind of, like, a more R&B version of it, which I think is really nice, actually. It was really cool that she didn't try and do a rock version of it, and she did what she's more comfortable with, which I thought was awesome." Sparks's version was released as a single in the UK on January 4, 2010.

Personnel
Confirmed by multiple sources including Billboard.
Fefe Dobson – songwriting, vocals
Matthew Wilder – producer and co-writer (on "Scar", "Be Strong", "Man Meets Boy", and "If I Was a Guy")
John5 – co-writer, guitar
Brent Paschke – guitar
Tim Armstrong – co-writer
Joan Jett – co-writer
Pharrell Williams – co-writer
Cyndi Lauper – co-writer
Courtney Love – co-writer
Shelly Peiken – co-writer
Billy Steinberg – co-writer
Chad Hugo – co-writer
Nina Gordon – backing vocals
Howard Benson – producer (on "This Is My Life" and "Don't Let It Go to Your Head")
Ben Grosse – producer
Tom Lord-Alge – producer (on "This Is My Life")

Cover versions

Commercially released cover versions or other commercial usage of Sunday Love songs by other artists.

Additional notes
 A There is an official music video for this version.

References

2006 albums
2012 albums
Fefe Dobson albums
Albums produced by Howard Benson
Albums produced by Tom Lord-Alge
Albums produced by Matthew Wilder
Albums produced by the Neptunes
Island Records albums